The 2010–11 Guy Walmsley & Co Welsh National League is the sixty-sixth season of the Welsh National League (Wrexham Area). The league began on 14 August 2010 and finished on 20 May 2011.

Premier Division

League table

Results

Division One

League table

Results

External links
Welsh National League

Welsh National League (Wrexham Area) seasons
3